This is a list of world flyweight boxing champions, as recognized by the four major sanctioning organizations in boxing:

 The World Boxing Association (WBA), established in 1921 as the National Boxing Association (NBA). The WBA often recognize up to two world champions in a given weight class; Super champion and Regular champion.
 The World Boxing Council (WBC), established in 1963.
 The International Boxing Federation (IBF), established in 1983.
 The World Boxing Organization (WBO), established in 1988.

World

IBF

WBC

WBA

WBO

See also
 List of British world boxing champions

References

External links
https://boxrec.com/media/index.php/National_Boxing_Association
https://boxrec.com/media/index.php/The_Ring_Magazine%27s_Annual_Ratings
https://www.hugmansworldchampionshipboxing.com/fly
https://titlehistories.com/boxing/na/usa/ny/nysac-fl.html

Flyweight
World boxing champions by weight class